Joseph Benjamin may refer to:

 Joey Benjamin (1961–2021), former English cricketer
 Joseph Benjamin (actor) (born 1976), Nigerian actor, model and television presenter
 Joe Benjamin (1919–1974), American jazz bassist
 Joe Benjamin (footballer) (born 1990), English footballer
 Joe Benjamin (boxer) (1908–1983), American boxer